Daniel Smuga (born 18 January 1997) is a Polish professional footballer who plays as a midfielder for Legionovia Legionowo.

Career

Smuga started his career with Polish fifth tier side Mazovia Mińsk Mazowiecki. In 2017, he signed for Victoria Sulejówek in the Polish fourth tier. Before the second half of 2017–18, Smuga signed for Polish top flight club Górnik Zabrze, where he made 26 appearances and scored 5 goals. Before the second half of 2018–19, he signed for Wigry Suwałki in the Polish second tier. In 2019, Smuga signed for Polish fourth tier team Miedź II Legnica.

References

External links
 

1997 births
Sportspeople from Warsaw
Association football midfielders
Ekstraklasa players
Górnik Zabrze players
I liga players
III liga players
IV liga players
Living people
Polonia Warsaw players
Polish footballers
Wigry Suwałki players
Legionovia Legionowo players